Zali Steggall  (born 16 April 1974) is an Australian politician, lawyer and former Olympic athlete. She has been independent member for Warringah since the 2019 Australian federal election when she defeated the incumbent, former Prime Minister Tony Abbott.

She is Australia's most internationally successful alpine skier, winning a bronze medal in slalom at the 1998 Winter Olympics in Nagano, and a World Championship gold medal in 1999. In the Winter Olympics she is Australia's first individual medalist, first female medalist, and only medalist in alpine skiing. Steggall's Olympic career extended from Albertville in 1992 to Salt Lake City in 2002.

Early life
Born in Manly, New South Wales, in 1974, she and her family lived in France from 1978 until 1989, and she started ski racing while living there, at the ski resort of Morzine in the French Alps. Her parents had intended to stay for only 18 months, but they liked the lifestyle so much that they stayed. Her mother, Dr. Susan Steggall, documented these ten years in Alpine Beach. A Family Adventure.

Steggall won European age championships at the ages of 10 and 13, and was a member of the French junior skiing team at the age of 14. Steggall was educated for 18 months in Sydney at Queenwood School for Girls following the family's return to Australia in 1989.

Steggall's grandfather Jack Steggall played ten Tests for Australia in rugby union; her father played rugby for Northern Suburbs, Manly Rugby Club and Manly Lifesavers. Her brother is Olympic snowboarder Zeke Steggall.

Skiing career
Despite moving back to Australia, the Steggall siblings regularly travelled to the northern hemisphere to train. She was also sent overseas by the Australian Ski Institute to train under Austrian alpine coach Helmut Spiegl.

Steggall was selected to make her Olympic debut in Albertville in 1992, at the age of 17. She came 23rd out of 44 entries in the giant slalom event, and failed to finish the slalom or the combined event. At the 1994 Olympics in Lillehammer, the size of the field was scaled back. Steggall came 22nd out of 28 athletes in the slalom and 24th and last in the giant slalom. She withdrew from the super-G and was unplaced in the overall standings.

In December 1995, Steggall broke into the top 10 in a World Cup event for the first time, placing 10th in the slalom event at Sankt Anton. In January 1996, Steggall came fourth at the World Championships in Sestriere, Italy, missing bronze by just 0.04 s.

Steggall came into the 1998 Winter Olympics in Nagano as one of the medal favourites. Three months earlier, she had become the first Australian woman to win a World Cup event in alpine skiing, after winning the slalom event at Park City, Utah. She posted the fastest time in both of her runs to win by 0.76sec. She then came fifth, sixth and tenth in the next three World Cup events to be ranked sixth in the world. Steggall won a Europa Cup event at Piancavallo. She won Australia's first individual Winter Olympic medal with a bronze in slalom skiing at Nagano in 1998. Her time of 1 m 32.67 s was 0.27 s behind the winner. In December, Steggall placed second in a World Cup event at Mammoth Mountain, missing the gold medal by 0.01 s to Anja Pärson. She had earlier placed seventh at Park City.

Steggall's success prompted the Australian Olympic Committee to expand the Australian Ski Institute into the Olympic Winter Institute of Australia. It was given a million-dollar annual budget and for the first time, Australia had a federal government-funded full-time training program to accompany the Australian Institute of Sport. It operated in six sports and supported 37 athletes and resulted in an immediate upturn in results with numerous athletes going on to win gold for Australia across the winter sport disciplines.

In 1999, Steggall won the slalom event at the World Championships held in Vail, Colorado, in the United States. That was her last podium finish at global level. In February 2000, she came 10th at Aare, Sweden the last top-10 result in her career.

Her career ended at the 2002 Winter Olympics in Salt Lake City. She failed to complete her first run and was eliminated.

Steggall was part of the Sydney Olympic torch relay in September 2000, carrying the Olympic flame along the pathway of Olympians in Manly and on the Manly ferry to Circular Quay. In 2004, she was part of the Athens Olympic torch relay, carrying the Olympic flame up the Sydney Harbour Bridge and handing over to Kieren Perkins.

Legal career
Steggall retired from skiing in 2002. She completed a BA in communications and media studies from Griffith University, Brisbane, Queensland, and then studied law. She was admitted as a solicitor while working for her father's legal practice, Roper & Steggall, in Manly, New South Wales. In 2008, she was admitted to the NSW Bar. Her principal areas of practice as a barrister have been family law, sports law, commercial law, real-property law, local government and planning law, corporations and insolvency law, and equity. Steggall was councillor to the NSW Bar Association and Chair of its Health, Sports and Recreation Committee from 2010 to 2013.

Steggall is currently an independent non-executive director, Olympic Winter Institute of Australia; director, Sport Australia Hall of Fame; and member of the Australian Sports Anti-Doping Agency (ASADA) Anti-Doping Rule Violation Panel. She was appointed an arbitrator of the Court of Arbitration for Sport (CAS) in January 2017. She was one of 12 worldwide arbitrators appointed to the ad hoc tribunal of CAS for the Pyeongchang Winter Olympic Games.

Steggall is on the Council of Governors at Queenwood School for Girls, Mosman.

Politics
On 27 January 2019, Steggall announced her candidacy as an independent in the Division of Warringah in the 2019 Australian federal election, running against former Australian Prime Minister and incumbent Liberal MP Tony Abbott on a platform advocating action on climate change, mental health and honest government.

During the campaign Steggall was the subject of an online smear campaign that attacked her Wikipedia page.

At the 18 May 2019 election, Steggall defeated Abbott, who had held Warringah since a 1994 by-election. Steggall won the seat with a two candidate preferred vote of 57.24%. Abbott went into the election holding Warringah with a majority of 11 percent. However, he lost over 12 percent of his primary vote from 2016, and finished over 4,100 votes behind Steggall on the first preference count. Her victory marked the first time that this traditional blue-ribbon Liberal seat had been out of the hands of the Liberals or their predecessors since its formation in 1922.

Steggall has stated that she does not support Australia's diplomatic boycott of the 2022 Beijing Winter Olympics.

Steggall joined the "Bring Julian Assange Home" parliamentary group.

Prior to her election, Steggall received a $100,000 donation from 8 members of the Kinghorn family that was paid on a single cheque issued by the Kinghorn Family Trust's Sole Director, John Kinghorn, who made his fortune from coal mining. Steggall recorded this donation split into eight parts, thus coming in below the reporting threshold. In February 2021, after an independent review by the Australian Electoral Commission, Steggall updated the records to reflect that this was one cheque. A year later on 14 February 2022 it was reported widely that Steggall had failed to record this donation correctly, although it had been corrected.  Steggall called the incident a "mistake" and a "rookie error".

Steggall retained her seat in the 2022 election, defeating Liberal Katherine Deves. She was seen as the pioneer of the teal independents who combined conservative views on economics with progressive views of the environment and won several seats at the 2022 election.

Personal life
Steggall was married to Olympic rower David Cameron from 1999 until their separation in 2006. They have two children from their marriage.

In 2007, her relationship with marketing executive Tim Irving was made public, and the couple became engaged in June 2008 and married later that year.

Honours
Steggall received an Australian Sports Medal in 2000, and a Medal of the Order of Australia in 2007. She was inducted into the Australian Institute of Sport 'Best of the Best' in 2001 and the Sport Australia Hall of Fame in 2004.

See also
 Voices groups in Australia
 Renewable energy debate
 Skiing in Australia

Notes

References

External links
 
 
 
 
 
 
 News report on her World Championship slalom victory
 speaker's information – source of some biographical information

1974 births
Living people
Olympic alpine skiers of Australia
Olympic bronze medalists for Australia
Alpine skiers at the 1992 Winter Olympics
Alpine skiers at the 1994 Winter Olympics
Alpine skiers at the 1998 Winter Olympics
Alpine skiers at the 2002 Winter Olympics
Sportswomen from New South Wales
Olympic medalists in alpine skiing
Australian female alpine skiers
Australian Institute of Sport alpine skiers
Medalists at the 1998 Winter Olympics
Recipients of the Medal of the Order of Australia
Recipients of the Australian Sports Medal
Sport Australia Hall of Fame inductees
Skiers from Sydney
People from Manly, New South Wales
Members of the Australian House of Representatives
Members of the Australian House of Representatives for Warringah
Women members of the Australian House of Representatives
Independent members of the Parliament of Australia
People educated at Queenwood School for Girls